Armando André Alfageme Palacios (born 3 November 1990) is a Peruvian professional footballer who plays as a midfielder for Universitario in the Peruvian Primera División.

Career

Early career
Alfageme began his career with Universitario, making his debut on 6 December 2009 against Melgar. He started the match and Universitario lost 5–0. He soon moved to UTC Cajamarca, making his debut for them on 24 February 2013 against Ayacucho in a Primera División match. He came on as an 80th-minute substitute for Víctor Guazá Lucumí as UTC Cajamarca won 3–1.

Deportivo Municipal
After a season with UTC Cajamarca Alfageme signed with Peruvian Segunda División side, Deportivo Municipal. He made his debut for the side on 27 April 2014 against Sport Victoria. He came on as an 88th-minute substitute for Óscar Vega as Deportivo Municipal drew the match 1–1. He scored his first professional goal of his career on 31 August 2014 in a Segunda División match against Willy Serrato. His 49th-minute goal to give Municipal the lead however was not enough as Serrato came back to equalize in the 69th minute and draw the match 1–1. After Deportivo Municipal earned promotion to the Primera División, Alfageme scored his first first division goal on 16 May 2015 against Sport Huancayo. He scored the first goal in a six-goal encounter that ended 3–3.

International
In May 2016, Alfageme was selected into the Peru 23-man squad for the Copa América Centenario. He made his international debut for the country on 23 May 2016 against Trinidad and Tobago in a friendly. He came on as a 70th-minute substitute for Alejandro Hohberg as Peru went on to win 4–0.

Career statistics

References

1990 births
Living people
Footballers from Lima
Peruvian footballers
Club Universitario de Deportes footballers
Universidad Técnica de Cajamarca footballers
Deportivo Municipal footballers
Association football midfielders
Peruvian Primera División players
Peru international footballers
Copa América Centenario players